16th Reconnaissance Squadron may refer to:

 The 906th Air Refueling Squadron, designated the 16th Reconnaissance Squadron (Medium) from January 1941 to April 1942
 The 16th Electronic Warfare Squadron, designated the 16th Reconnaissance Squadron (Bomber) from May 1943 to May 1944 and 16th Reconnaissance Squadron, Heavy (Special) from May 1944 to April 1945

See also
 The 16th Photographic Reconnaissance Squadron
 The 16th Tactical Reconnaissance Squadron